Inferno (Dante Pertuz) is a fictional superhero appearing in American comic books published by Marvel Comics. Created by Charles Soule and Joe Madureira, the character first appeared in Inhuman #1 (June 2014).

Publication history
Pertuz was created by writer Charles Soule and artist Joe Madureira as the protagonist of the Inhumans comic, Inhuman. He made his debut in the comic's first issue, which was included as a backup feature to The Amazing Spider-Man vol. 2 #1. In the context of the series, Pertuz is portrayed in either his late teens or early twenties, and is of Inhuman descent. His powers are activated when the chemical known as Terrigen Mist is spread throughout the world in the aftermath of the Inhumanity storyline. Pertuz would appear in most issues of the Inhuman comic, and will appear in the Uncanny Inhumans series, a preview of which was featured as a backup for Marvel's Free Comic Book Day comic, All-New, All-Different Avengers.

Since his debut, Marvel has pushed Pertuz as a key character in their universe, usually to represent their Inhuman line of comics. He was included in the "Avengers NOW!" promotional artwork, where he was beside iconic characters such as Iron Man and the new Thor and Captain America. He was also beside Medusa as Inhuman representation in the first issue of the major crossover storyline, "Secret Wars". He was featured in promotional images for the All-New, All-Different Marvel line of comics.

Fictional character biography
Living in Des Plaines, Illinois, Dante Pertuz was a drummer for a wedding band to support his pregnant sister and sick mother. One day during the Inhumanity storyline, the Terrigen Mist (a chemical used to activate the abilities of Inhumans) flew through his neighborhood following the aftermath of Black Bolt's detonation of the Terrigen bomb during his fight with Thanos in the Infinity storyline. Dante, unknowingly of partial Inhuman descent, underwent Terrigenesis, as did his mother; his sister being spared due to not inheriting the gene. His mother was killed during the process. During all this, an Inhuman named Lash appeared, who believed that only a certain few should be chosen for the transformation. He attempts to kill the family, but Dante emerges with new flame based powers and fights off Lash. Towards the end of the fight, the Inhuman queen Medusa comes to his aid until Lash flees. She befriends Dante and he becomes the first NuHuman (people of both human and Inhuman ancestry) to join Inhuman society.

As the months go on, Dante and his sister, who suggested his Inhuman name, move to New Attilan. As thousands of NuHumans are revealed across the world, with the Terrigen Mist spreading around the Earth, many of them move to New Attilan now that Medusa has publicly announced that Attilan will be an independent nation and safe haven to all Inhumans and NuHumans. Dante trains as a soldier under the leadership of Gorgon and befriends fellow NuHumans Flint, Naja, and Kamala Khan (the new Ms. Marvel). Pertuz is one of the main forces in protecting Attilan from several of the Inhumans' enemies, and is recruited to find the missing Inhuman king Black Bolt. Eventually, Medusa's advisor Lineage betrays the Inhumans as he is revealed to be an ally of Lash. As Lineage uses a codex of human and Inhuman DNA to cause the humans of Jersey City to become deranged, Pertuz and his friends aid Ms. Marvel in subduing the city's people until Lineage is killed by Karnak. The battle ends while his sister Gabriella is in labor. Dante goes to Gabriella as her son is born. Dante comforts his nephew who has inherited the Inhuman gene.

Not long afterwards, during the Secret Wars storyline, Earth-616 faces its imminent end as it faces an incursion of Earth-1610. Pertuz is there for the universe's final battle against the Children of Tomorrow alongside all the world's major superheroes. However, the universe meets its end as the world fades into oblivion, killing him, alongside Medusa and the rest of the universe. Like the rest of the people and heroes who perished at the hand of the incursion, Doctor Doom saves them all and puts them on his newly created planet of Battleworld, wiping everyone's memories of the universe before it.

During the Inhumans vs. X-Men storyline after the restoration of the universe, Inferno and Iso are sent by Medusa to find out what happened to Black Bolt while she prepares for battle. Iso and Inferno are chased by Wolverine and the time-displaced Angel. They manage to escape through a portal just before Wolverine can catch them. On the other side of the portal, they find Old Man Logan waiting for them. While Inferno distracts Logan, Iso discovers Forge nearby with a device that the X-Men are planning to use to alter the structure of the Terrigen Cloud so they can destroy it. Iso and Inferno manage to defeat Logan and Forge and destroy the device, then flee while taking Forge prisoner.

During the Secret Empire storyline, Inferno joins up with Daisy Johnson's Secret Warriors.

Powers and abilities
As a member of the fictional offshoot of humanity, Inhumans, Inferno possesses physical strength, durability, speed, endurance, and reflexes significantly greater than the maximum potential attainable by humans. He has the ability to generate plasmoid flames from thin air without using oxygen or combustible. He can create volcanos from the ground which can project lava. When Inferno lost one of his arms, his pyroplasmic regeneration powers acted as a regenerative healing factor and granted him a new one. Under his volcanic form, his body is cover with flaming molten rocks. Inferno has also the ability to fly.

Reception

Accolades 

 In 2016, Screen Rant ranked Inferno 7th in their "10 Most Powerful Inhumans In The Marvel Universe" list.
 In 2018, CBR.com ranked Inferno 14th in their "20 Most Powerful Inhumans" list.
 In 2019, CBR.com ranked Inferno 5th in their "10 Most Powerful Members of Marvel's Secret Warriors" list.
 In 2021, Screen Rant included Inferno in their "Marvel: 10 Incredible Latinx Characters" list.

In other media

Television

 Inferno appears in Avengers Assemble, voiced by Anthony Del Rio. This version lived in Maple Falls in Upstate New York and lived a normal life until the episode "Inhumans Among Us", in which an Inhuman ship carrying Seeker and the Alpha Primitives crashed in the nearby mountains. As a result, Terrigen Fog was released and affected Dante. The Avengers and the Inhuman Royal Family find Dante's Terrigen cocoon and fight for its possession until Dante emerges and goes on a rampage. The two parties work together to stop Dante until the Hulk and Lockjaw bring a Terrigen Crystal, which the Avengers and Inhumans use to disperse more Terrigen fog and restore Dante and the Alpha Primitives' minds. Now in control of himself, Dante befriends the Inhumans and lives with them part-time in Attilan. In "The Inhuman Condition", Ultron captures Dante and a group of Inhumans, but they are later freed by the Avengers. In "The Kids Are All Right", Dante and Ms. Marvel join forces with Captain America and Iron Man to fight off an Ultron Sentry before the latter pair give the former a tour of Avengers Tower. When the Ghost attacks, the four heroes work with the Falcon to defeat him. In "Civil War, Part 1: The Fall of Attilan", an imprisoned Maximus brainwashes Dante into losing control in order to detonate a Terrigen bomb capable of leveling New Attilan. After the Hulk breaks Dante free, the latter turns himself over to politician Truman Marsh, who established an Inhuman Registration Act. In "Civil War, Part 4: Avengers Revolution", Ultron brainwashes Dante and several Inhumans via their Registration disks, but the Hulk subdued Dante so Iron Man can negate the disks' control frequency.

Film

 Inferno appears in Marvel Rising: Secret Warriors, voiced by Tyler Posey.

Video games
 Inferno appears as a playable character in Lego Marvel Super Heroes 2.
 Inferno appears as a playable character in Marvel: Future Fight.
 Dante Pertuz appears as a supporting character in Marvel's Avengers, voiced by Michael Johnston.

References

External links
 Inferno at Marvel Wiki
 
 Inferno at Comic Vine

Comics characters introduced in 2014
Characters created by Charles Soule
Characters created by Joe Madureira
Fictional characters with fire or heat abilities
Fictional characters with superhuman durability or invulnerability
Fictional Hispanic and Latino American people
Marvel Comics characters with accelerated healing
Inhumans